The Alagoas gubernatorial election was held on 5 October 2014 to elect the next governor of the state of Alagoas. If no candidate had received more than 50% of the vote, a second-round runoff election would have been held on 26 October.  Governor Teotônio Vilela Filho was ineligible due to term limits.  Federal Deputy Renan Filho of the PMDB won election to the open seat in the first round.

Candidates

Coalitions

Opinion polling

Results

References

October 2014 events in South America
Alagoas gubernatorial elections
2014 Brazilian gubernatorial elections